KXTG (750 AM, "The Game") is a sports radio station in Portland, Oregon. Its transmitter is located in Damascus, while studios are in downtown Portland. It is owned by Alpha Media, a company owned by veteran radio executive Larry Wilson.

Programming 
KXTG is Portland's flagship home to the March Madness, the Portland Timbers of Major League Soccer, and the Seattle Mariners. It also served as home of the Portland Steel of the Arena Football League in 2016.

The Bald Faced Truth with host John Canzano airs weekdays on KXTG. Canzano's show was the inaugural sports program on the station and remains on air today. The Bald Faced Truth launched The Game's sports programming on May 12, 2008. Among the first guests that first day were golfer Peter Jacobsen and former United States' President Barack Obama.

History
KXTG first began broadcasting in 1926 as KXL.  KXL was bought by Alpha Broadcasting in 2009, along with a sister station, KXTG, on the FM band.  That station first signed on as 95.5 KXL-FM in June 1965 with a long-running beautiful music format followed by adult contemporary.  On March 26, 1999, KXL-FM became KXJM, with a successful Rhythmic contemporary format that lasted until May 12, 2008, when it switched formats to sports. The KXJM call letters, Rhythmic format, and all other intellectual property were acquired by CBS Radio and moved to 107.5 FM.

At 8:47 a.m. on March 15, 2011, KXL started simulcasting on 101.1 FM, replacing the Active rock format of KUFO. After two months of the KXL news/talk format being heard on both stations, at 4 p.m. on May 25, 2011, the 750 frequency switched from news/talk to sports, changing its branding to "750 The Game" (from KXTG 95.5). Thus, KXL's news/talk format is now exclusively on FM.

On June 1, 2011, KXL changed call letters (after 85 years) to KXTG to match "The Game" branding. The KXTG call letters and "The Game" sports format were recently at 95.5 FM (now KBFF). In 2013, KXTG switched affiliations from Fox Sports Radio to NBC Sports Radio. (Fox Sports Radio is now on 620 KPOJ.) In October 2015, KXTG switched affiliations from NBC Sports Radio to CBS Sports Radio.

In July 2014, KXTG began simulcasting on FM translator K274AR 102.7 FM. On December 19, 2014, K274AR upgraded from 10 watts at 102.7 FM to 99 watts at 102.9 FM. On February 3, 2015, K274AR changed call letters to K275CH.

In August 2019, KXTG would drop its simulcast on the 102.9 FM translator frequency, due to a format change.

Ownership history

From 1955 to 1998, KXL was owned by Les Smith; Rose City Radio, a company owned by Portland Trail Blazers owner Paul Allen, bought it and KXTG from Smith in 1998 for a reported $42 million. In May 2009, it was announced that Larry Wilson, the founder and former owner of Citadel Broadcasting, bought KXL and KXTG from Rose City for $11 million.

References

External links
KXTG official website

FCC History Cards for KXTG

XTG
Sports radio stations in the United States
Radio stations established in 1926
1926 establishments in Oregon
CBS Sports Radio stations
Alpha Media radio stations